The 1912 Kansas Jayhawks football team was an American football team that represented the University of Kansas as a member of the Missouri Valley Conference (MVC) during the 1912 college football season. In their first season under head coach Arthur Mosse, the Jayhawks compiled a 4–4 record (1–2 against conference opponents), finished in fifth place in the MVC, and outscored opponents by a total of 128 to 45. The Jayhawks played their home games at McCook Field in Lawrence, Kansas. Howard Brownlee was the team captain.

Schedule

References

Kansas
Kansas Jayhawks football seasons
Kansas Jayhawks football